Tangalle Fort is a small Dutch fort located in the coastal town of Tangalle, Sri Lanka. The Dutch used Tangalle as an important anchorage on the southern coast of the island.

Tangalle fort differs from most other forts constructed by the Dutch, in that the fort has no massive ramparts. The fort was significantly altered by the British in the middle of the 19th century when it was converted into a prison. The British also used Tangalle as an anchorage. The fort is still being used as a prison by the Department of Prisons.

See also
 Forts of Sri Lanka

References

Further reading
 

British forts in Sri Lanka
Dutch forts in Sri Lanka
Forts in Southern Province, Sri Lanka
Buildings and structures in Tangalle